Mirabella Imbaccari (Latin: Imachara and Imacara) is a comune (municipality) in the Metropolitan City of Catania in the Italian region Sicily, located about  southeast of Palermo and about  southwest of Catania.  

Mirabella Imbaccari borders the  municipalities of Caltagirone and Piazza Armerina.

References

External links
 Official website
 

Cities and towns in Sicily